Sir Robert Juckes Clifton, 9th Baronet (24 December 1826 – 30 May 1869) was an English Liberal Party politician who sat in the House of Commons in two periods between 1861 and 1869.

Clifton was the son of Sir Juckes Granville Juckes-Clifton, 8th Baronet and his second wife Marianne Swinfen, daughter of John Swinfen of Swinfen, Staffordshire. He was educated at Eton College and Christ Church, Oxford. He succeeded his father to the baronetcy in 1852, but had to live for several years in France because of his debts from gambling and horse racing (see George Samuel Ford).

In December 1861, Clifton was elected at a by-election as a Member of Parliament (MP) for Nottingham. He was re-elected at the 1865 general election, but his election was declared void on 20 April 1866. He was re-elected for Nottingham at the 1868 general election but died a year later at the age of 42 from typhoid fever.

In 1868 building work began on the Clifton Colliery at Wilford after coal was found on the estate. The colliery opened in 1870 after Clifton's death, as did the Wilford Toll Bridge for which he was also responsible.

Clifton married Geraldine Isabella O'Meara, daughter of Colonel John O'Meara, in 1863. They had no children and the baronetcy became extinct upon his death. The Clifton estates went to his cousin's son Henry Robert Markham.

References

External links

1826 births
1869 deaths
Liberal Party (UK) MPs for English constituencies
UK MPs 1868–1874
UK MPs 1859–1865
People educated at Eton College
Alumni of Christ Church, Oxford
Baronets in the Baronetage of England
Deaths from typhoid fever
Politicians from Nottingham
Robert